Russ Malkin is a British TV producer, director and founder of Big Earth Productions. He has created documentaries and formats for many broadcasters globally including BBC, ITV, Sky, National Geographic, Amazon and Discovery. Often working with high-profile personalities, Malkin has filmed across all seven continents in some of the harshest conditions on the planet. He is best known for the adventure travel documentaries Long Way Round, Long Way Down and Long Way Up with actors and keen motorcyclists Ewan McGregor and Charley Boorman. His recent work includes "Prince Harry in Africa", "David Beckham: For the Love of the Game" and three-part National Geographic documentary “Fiennes: Return to the Nile”.

Works

Prince Harry in Africa 
In 2016, Malkin produced and directed Prince Harry in Africa following the Prince's journey from Kensington Palace to Lesotho in Southern Africa to see the progress being made by his charity Sentebale, to combat HIV/AIDS. The informative and emotive documentary, featuring guest appearances from Sir Elton John, Chris Martin and Joss Stone, was produced by Big Earth for ITV.

David Beckham: For the Love of the Game 
In 2015, Malkin produced and directed 'David Beckham For The Love Of The Game',  which saw David Beckham fulfil his ambition of playing seven unique football matches on seven continents in under nine days, for his UNICEF 7 Fund. The documentary features matches in the jungles of Papua New Guinea, with earthquake survivors among the historic temples of Nepal, with refugees on the desert planes of Djibouti and a game in the dangerous barrios of Buenos Aires. It also includes the unique, World's First official game of football on the isolated and inaccessible continent of Antarctica. The final game took place in front of 70,000 fans raising £1M for UNICEF. Big Earth successfully completed this major logistical undertaking to produce a 90 minute special for worldwide distribution with the BBC.

Fiennes: Return to the Nile 
In 2019, Malkin was the Executive Producer for Ranulph and Joseph Fiennes’ National Geographic documentary, ‘Fiennes: Return to the Nile.’ The three-part series saw the Fiennes cousins, comprising world-renowned explorer and award-winning actor, re-trace Ranulph’s expedition in Egypt back in the 1960s, including a rare chance to stay overnight in the giant pyramid of Cheops.

Joss Stones' Total World Tour 
In 2015, Russ collaborated with Joss Stone and New Earth Films to follow Stone on her SE Asia tour to Malaysia, Indonesia and the Philippines. The online adventure saw Joss visit causes close to her heart.

Long Way Series 
Malkin is best known for producing and directing the iconic Long Way Round (2004), Long Way Down (2007) and Long Way Up (2020) featuring Charley Boorman and Ewan McGregor. The series follows McGregor and Boorman as they motorcycle across the globe, the long way.

Long Way Round 
Long Way Round saw McGregor and Boorman ride from London to New York. Covering 20,000 miles through Europe, Ukraine, Kazakhstan, Mongolia and Russia, across the Pacific to Alaska, then down through Canada and America on their BMW motorcycles with Malkin and co-director-producer David Alexanian riding alongside in support vehicles.

Long Way Down 
During Long Way Down, McGregor and Boorman rode 15,000 miles through 18 countries, from John O’Groats at the northernmost tip of Scotland to Cape Agulhas, the Southernmost tip of South Africa the Long Way Down.

Long Way Up 
In the latest series for Apple TV, Long Way Up, McGregor, Boorman, Alexanian and Malkin reunite to travel from the southernmost tip of Argentina to Los Angeles, USA, covering 13,000 miles across 13 countries. The motorcycles and support vehicles are all-electric presenting a host of new challenges for the team.

Adventures with Charley Boorman 
Malkin and Boorman have frequently collaborated on adventure shows for TV. The format of these programmes meant that Malkin also made frequent on-screen appearances. Each series has combined social media, books, DVDs and commercial partnerships.

Race to Dakar 

In 2006, Russ produced and directed ‘Race to Dakar’, a documentary series following Charley Boorman's entry into the 2006 Dakar Rally from Lisbon to Dakar. First aired on Sky Two and ABC Television (Australia) during 2006, it was also released as a book.

By Any Means 

In 2008 and 2009 respectively, Malkin produced and directed ‘By Any Means’ and ‘Right to the Edge: Sydney to Tokyo By Any Means' for the BBC, which followed Malkin and Charley Boorman as they travelled from Ireland to Australia and then Australia to Japan, by any means necessary: on all forms of transport; including gondolas, yachts and elephants.

Charley Boorman's Extreme Frontiers 
In 2011, Malkin produced, directed and often featured in the third collaboration with Boorman for the Channel 5 adventure travel series, Charley Boorman's Extreme Frontiers which spawned a follow-up book and DVD, Extreme Frontiers: Racing Across Canada from Newfoundland to the Rockies. The show saw Charley Boorman undertake extraordinary adventures through Canada, South Africa and the USA on the back of his motorbike.

Other Works 
Russ has produced and directed a number of short-form digital brand adventures, most recently featuring Henry Cavill and Anna Friel. He has also worked on other television productions including Murder Or Mutiny, Britain in Motion, Ball’s in Our Court, Road Rivals (UK Travel Channel), Adventure or Luxury (Amazon Prime), Tales of Travel (CNN),  the World Wakeboarding Championships and Clothes Show Live for ITV , along with World's Fittest Woman (2003).

As well as television, production and branded content, Russ wrote his book ‘Big Earth's 101 Amazing Adventures,’ published by Transworld in 2011. The book documents the must-go places and routes Russ has visited for other keen adventurers to follow. During Malkin’s early career, he produced events that broke several world records including the world’s fastest produced feature film in 1990, the world’s largest aerobics event with the 1993 Boots' Aerobathon as well as three world records for the indoor go-karting, outdoor go karting and electric go-karting. Malkin was also responsible for saving the HEMS London Air Ambulance Service after it lost its sponsor, securing sponsorship from Richard Branson who assumed the contract for the next 10 years.

As a fellow of Unicef and the Royal Geographical Society, Russ’ philosophy is ‘Travel the world and do some good at the same time’.

References

External links

Big Earth Ltd. Russ Malkin's TV Production company.

English television directors
English television producers
Long-distance motorcycle riding
Motorcycling mass media people
Living people
Year of birth missing (living people)